Tarte à la bouillie are sweet-dough custard tarts. They are part of Cajun cuisine.

See also
 List of custard desserts

References

Cajun cuisine
Custard desserts
Tarts